Kesler may refer to one of these people:

 Charles R. Kesler, American academic
 Gordon Kesler, Canadian politician
 Hindrek Kesler (born 1958), Estonian architect
 Jay Kesler, American academic
 Reg Kesler (1919–2001), Canadian rodeo stock contractor
 Ryan Kesler (born 1984), American professional ice hockey player
 Stan Kesler (1928–2020), American musician, songwriter, and record producer

See also 
 Lee–Kesler method
 Keßler (disambiguation)
 Kessler (disambiguation)
 Kiesler